Eucalyptus tetrapleura, commonly known as the square-fruited ironbark, is a species of small to medium-sized tree that is endemic to northern New South Wales. It has thick, dark ironbark on the trunk and branches, lance-shaped to curved adult leaves, flower buds in groups of seven, white flowers and conical fruit that is square in cross-section.

Description
It has thick, rough, dark grey, furrowed ironbark on the trunk and branches. Flowering occurs between June and August and the flowers are white.

Taxonomy and naming
Eucalyptus tetrapleura was first formally described in 1962 by Lawrie Johnson in Anderson's paper in Contributions from the New South Wales National Herbarium. The specific epithet (tetrapleura) is from ancient Greek words meaning "four" and "rib", referring to the four ribs of the fruit.

Distribution and habitat
The square-fruited ironbark grows in open forest on poorly-drained soil on slightly sloping ground between Casino and Grafton in northern New South Wales.

References

tetrapleura
Myrtales of Australia
Flora of New South Wales
Trees of Australia
Plants described in 1962